Electoral district no. 6 is one of the 12 multi-member electoral districts of the Riigikogu, the national legislature of Estonia. The district was established in 2003 when the existing electoral district no. 6 was split into two. It is conterminous with the county of Lääne-Viru. The district currently elects five of the 101 members of the Riigikogu using the open party-list proportional representation electoral system. At the 2019 parliamentary election it had 44,583 registered electors.

Electoral system
Electoral district no. 6 currently elects five of the 101 members of the Riigikogu using the open party-list proportional representation electoral system. The allocation of seats is carried out in three stages. In the first stage, any individual candidate, regardless of whether they are a party or independent candidate, who receives more votes than the district's simple quota (Hare quota: valid votes in district/number of seats allocated to district) is elected via a personal mandate. In the second stage, district mandates are allocated to parties by dividing their district votes by the district's simple quota. Only parties that reach the 5% national threshold compete for district mandates and any personal mandates won by the party are subtracted from the party's district mandates. Any unallocated district seats are added to a national pool of compensatory seats. In the final stage, compensatory mandates are calculated based on the national vote and using a modified D'Hondt method. Only parties that reach the 5% national threshold compete for compensatory seats and any personal and district mandates won by the party are subtracted from the party's compensatory mandates. Though calculated nationally, compensatory mandates are allocated at the district level.

Seats
Seats allocated to electoral district no. 6 by the National Electoral Committee of Estonia at each election was as follows:
 2023 - 5
 2019 - 5
 2015 - 5
 2011 - 5
 2007 - 6
 2003 - 6

Election results

Summary

(Excludes compensatory seats)

Detailed

2023
Results of the 2023 parliamentary election held on 5 March 2023:

The following candidates were elected:
 Personal mandates - Hanno Pevkur (REF), 6,567 votes.
 District mandates - Anti Poolamets (EKRE), 2,831 votes. 
 Compensatory mandates - Evelin Poolamets (EKRE), 968 votes; Tarmo Tamm (EE200), 876 votes.

2019
Results of the 2019 parliamentary election held on 3 March 2019:

The following candidates were elected:
 District mandates - Siret Kotka-Repinski (K), 2,095 votes; Anti Poolamets (EKRE), 3,335 votes; Taavi Rõivas (RE), 2,847 votes; and Üllar Saaremäe (I), 2,023 votes.
 Compensatory mandates - Indrek Saar (SDE), 1,332 votes.

2015
Results of the 2015 parliamentary election held on 1 March 2015:

The following candidates were elected:
 District mandates - Siret Kotka (K), 2,558 votes; Marko Pomerants (IRL), 2,681 votes; and Valdo Randpere (RE), 3,170 votes.

2011
Results of the 2011 parliamentary election held on 6 March 2011:

The following candidates were elected:
 District mandates - Hanno Pevkur (RE), 3,784 votes; Marko Pomerants (IRL), 3,455 votes; Indrek Saar (SDE), 3,931 votes; and Peeter Võsa (K), 1,936 votes.
 Compensatory mandates - Rannar Vassiljev (SDE), 1,960 votes.

2007
Results of the 2007 parliamentary election held on 4 March 2007:

The following candidates were elected:
 District mandates - Kristiina Ojuland (RE), 3,519 votes; Marko Pomerants (IRL), 3,156 votes; Indrek Saar (SDE), 1,855 votes; and Toomas Varek (K), 2,890 votes.

2003
Results of the 2003 parliamentary election held on 2 March 2003:

The following candidates were elected:
 Personal mandates - Marko Pomerants (ÜVE-RP), 4,324 votes; 
 District mandates - Peeter Kreitzberg (K), 2,541 votes; and Vello Tafenau (ERL), 1,481 votes.
 Compensatory mandates - Mart Laar (I), 1,055 votes; Kadi Pärnits (RM), 786 votes; Märt Rask (RE), 1,307 votes; and Toomas Varek (K), 1,221 votes.

References

Riigikogu electoral district
06
06